Hermann Hänggi (15 October 1894 – 21 November 1978) was a Swiss gymnast and Olympic Champion. He competed at the 1928 Summer Olympics, where he won two gold medals, one silver and one bronze medal.

References

1894 births
1978 deaths
Swiss male artistic gymnasts
Gymnasts at the 1928 Summer Olympics
Olympic gymnasts of Switzerland
Olympic gold medalists for Switzerland
Olympic silver medalists for Switzerland
Olympic bronze medalists for Switzerland
Olympic medalists in gymnastics
Medalists at the 1928 Summer Olympics
20th-century Swiss people